The Parioli Challenger was a professional tennis tournament in Italy played on clay courts that was part of the ATP Challenger Series. It was held annually in Parioli, Rome from 1979 to 1993.

Past finals

Singles

Doubles

References
Official website of the International Tennis Federation

ATP Challenger Tour
Clay court tennis tournaments
Sports competitions in Rome
Tennis tournaments in Italy